Other: British and Irish Poetry since 1970 is a poetry anthology edited by Richard Caddel and Peter Quartermain, and published in 1999 by Wesleyan University Press. According to the Introduction

One purpose of this anthology is ... to uncover what ... The Movement ... helped to bury.

It is therefore self-consciously against what was by then the old mainstream in British poetry.

Poets in Other: British and Irish Poetry since 1970
John Agard - Tony Baker - Anthony Barnett  - Richard Caddel - Cris Cheek - Thomas A. Clark - Bob Cobbing- Brian Coffey - Kelvin Corcoran - Andrew Crozier - Fred D'Aguiar - Ken Edwards - Peter Finch - Allen Fisher - Roy Fisher - Veronica Forrest-Thomson - Ulli Freer - Harry Gilonis - Jonathan Griffin - Bill Griffiths - Alan Halsey - Lee Harwood - Michael Haslam - Randolph Healy - John James - Amryl Johnson - Linton Kwesi Johnson - Tom Leonard - Tony Lopez - Rob MacKenzie - Barry MacSweeney - Billy Mills - Geraldine Monk - Eric Mottram - Wendy Mulford - Grace Nichols -Douglas Oliver - Maggie O'Sullivan - Tom Pickard - Elaine Randell - Tom Raworth - Carlyle Reedy - Denise Riley - John Riley - Peter Riley - Maurice Scully - John Seed - Gavin Selerie - Robert Sheppard - Colin Simms - Iain Sinclair - Chris Torrance - Gael Turnbull - Catherine Walsh - Benjamin Zephaniah

See also
 1999 in poetry
 1999 in literature
 20th century in literature
 20th century in poetry
 English poetry
 Irish poetry
 List of poetry anthologies

1999 poetry books
British Poetry Revival
British poetry anthologies
Irish poetry anthologies
Wesleyan University Press books